The Central Mass Mobilization Department of the Central Committee of the Communist Party of Vietnam is an advisory body to the Central Committee, and directly subordinate to the Politburo. It is chiefly responsible for public security and public relations.

Heads
 Xuân Thủy (1976–1978)
 Nguyễn Văn Linh (1978–1980)
 Trần Quốc Hoàn (1980–1986)
 Vũ Oanh (1986–1987)
 Phan Minh Tánh (1987–1996)
 Phạm Thế Duyệt (1996–1997)
 Nguyễn Minh Triết (1997–2000)
 Trương Quang Được (2000–2002)
 Tòng Thị Phóng (2002–2007)
 Hà Thị Khiết (2007–2016)
 Trương Thị Mai (2016–2021)
 Bùi Thị Minh Hoài (2021–present)

References

Central Committee of the Communist Party of Vietnam
1976 establishments in Vietnam